The men's decathlon event at the 2021 European Athletics U23 Championships was held in Tallinn, Estonia, at Kadriorg Stadium on 10 and 11 July.

Records
Prior to the competition, the records were as follows:

Results

Final standings

References

Decathlon
Combined events at the European Athletics U23 Championships